The iPad 2 is a tablet designed, developed and marketed by Apple Inc. Compared to the first iPad, as the second model in the iPad line, it gained a faster dual core A5 processor, a lighter build structure, and was the first iPad to feature VGA front-facing and 720p rear-facing cameras designed for FaceTime video calling.

The device was available initially with three storage sizes – 16, 32 and 64 GB – and two varying connectivity options – Wi-Fi only or Wi-Fi and cellular. Each variation of the device is available with either a black or white front glass panel. However, upon the release of the 3rd generation iPad in March 2012, only the 16 GB variation remained available.

The product became available in March through May 2011.

The device received generally positive reception from various blogs and publications. Although it was praised for its hardware improvement, such as the new Apple A5 chip, the software restriction on the iPad 2 and iOS in general drew criticism from various technology commentators. The device sold well in its first month of sales with 2.4–2.6 million units sold and 11.12 million units were sold in the third quarter of 2011.

A popular product, with a lower screen resolution, and performance than the two Retina models that followed it but a lighter build and longer battery life, it remained in the Apple line-up as an entry-level iPad model for three years until March 2014, latterly with a silent upgrade to a die-shrunk version of the A5 processor. Its basic design formed the core of the first iPad mini, which had the same screen pixel count and similar features at a smaller size.

Originally shipped with iOS 4.3, with the release of iOS 9, the iPad 2 became the only device powered by the Apple A5 to have received six major versions of IOS.

History

Apple sent invitations to journalists on February 23, 2011, for a media event on March 2. On March 2, 2011, CEO Steve Jobs unveiled the device at the Yerba Buena Center for the Arts, despite being on medical leave. Upon the announcement of the iPad 2, the original iPad was discontinued from sales online and at Apple authorized retail stores.

Apple began selling the iPad 2 on its website on March 11, and in its U.S. retail stores at 5 pm local time on that date. Many stores in major cities, such as New York, sold out within hours. Online shipping delays had increased to three to four weeks on Sunday and four to five weeks by Tuesday.

The iPad 2 was released internationally in 25 other countries on March 25, 2011. The countries included Australia, Austria, Belgium, Canada, Czech Republic, Denmark, Finland, France, Germany, Greece, Iceland, Italy, Ireland, Hungary, Luxembourg, Mexico, Netherlands, New Zealand, Norway, Poland, Portugal, Spain, Sweden, Switzerland, and the United Kingdom.

The April 29, 2011 release date for Japan was postponed due to the earthquake and tsunami which struck the nation on March 11, 2011. The iPads were delayed due to the NAND flash storage chip used in the iPads being created by Toshiba, which was affected by the earthquake and tsunami thus resulting in the suspension of operations for an indefinite period of time. The slowdown caused analysts to downgrade Apple's stock.

The iPad 2 was later released in Hong Kong, India, South Korea, Singapore, Philippines, Malaysia and other countries including Japan on April 29, 2011. It was then released in numerous other nations which include China, Estonia, Thailand, Brazil, Russia and Taiwan on two major release dates, May 6 and 27.

The 32 and 64GB models were discontinued on March 7, 2012, upon the introduction of the third generation iPad. The 16GB Wi-Fi and 16GB Wi-Fi + 3G models were discontinued on March 18, 2014.

Features

Software

In late March 2011, the iPad 2 was released alongside iOS 4.3, which primarily introduced Airplay Mirroring and Home Sharing among other features. On October 12, 2011, upon the release of the iPhone 4S, the iPad was upgradable to the iOS 5 firmware update which brought over 200 new user features to iOS compatible devices including Notification Center, iMessage, Reminders, and an updated notifications system, using a new "banner" style instead of the previously used pop-up "alert" style.

The iPad 2 comes with several applications by default, including Safari, Mail, Photos, Video, Music, iTunes (store), Maps, Notes, Calendar, Photo Booth, and Contacts. The App Store is also available as a default application, it enables users to download from a database of 800,000 applications, the price of these applications is set by the developers. Like all iOS devices, the iPad 2 can sync music, videos, apps and photos with a Mac or PC using iTunes, although when using iOS 5 and later, the user does not have to connect the iPad to the computer. iCloud also allows users to backup and sync their data with other compatible iOS devices via the internet. Game Center is available as a native social gaming platform on iOS, games downloaded via the App Store that have this feature enabled are able to integrate their achievement points, high-scores and bonus system across all iOS devices into a single accumulative points and social platform. Although the tablet is not designed to make phone calls over a cellular network, a user can use a wired headset or the built-in speaker and microphone and place phone calls over Wi-Fi or cellular using a VoIP application.

The iPad 2 also adds the ability to run GarageBand, iMovie, and the iWork apps Pages, Keynote, and Numbers. These applications do not come with the iPad but are instead official applications from Apple sold within the App Store. On March 7, 2012, after the unveiling of the third generation iPad, the firmware of the iPad 2 was upgradable to iOS 5.1. Scott Rohde, a senior Sony executive described the iPad as "a game console disguised as a device that can be appropriated in the business workplace."

On September 19, 2012, almost a week after the announcement of the iPhone 5, iOS 6 was released for numerous iOS devices, including the iPad 2 and iPhone 4S. However, on iOS 6, not all features are available on the iPad 2. The software upgrade was downloadable as an over the air (OTA) update package and contains two hundred new features, including a mapping software designed by Apple dubbed Apple Maps, a "Clock" app, which features a timer, stopwatch and alarm, and Facebook integration among other new features and tweaks.

The iPad 2 is compatible with iOS 7, which was released on September 18, 2013. However, some features are not available. For example, like the iPhone 4, the Notification Center and the Control Center use the transparent style instead of the translucent style in later iOS models. Also, AirDrop, which was first released in iOS 7, was only supported by the iPad 4 or later.

The iPad 2 can run iOS 8, which was released on September 17, 2014, making it the first iOS device to run five major versions of iOS (including iOS 4, 5, 6, 7, and 8). While the OS runs on the device, most of its new features do not work because of relatively aged hardware and therefore, its performance is limited. Users have also reported numerous problems after receiving the update including the accessibility features and battery-related issues. Many users speculated that the iPad 2 was going to be dropped from updating to iOS 8 along with the iPhone 4, the same process that happened with the iPhone 3GS and the iPod Touch (fourth generation) and earlier models, considering that the model was more than 3 years old.

It was confirmed on June 8, 2015, at Apple's WWDC that the iPad 2 would run iOS 9, making it the first iOS device to run six major versions of iOS. As with previous releases, though, many headline features were unavailable on the iPad 2, including predictive Siri, translucency effects, split-view, slide-over and picture-in-picture multitasking and the Health app. iOS 9 is said to feature performance improvements that may help the aging device function more smoothly, and initial tests suggest that it did not significantly impact available space. Other A5-based devices will also run iOS 9 including the iPhone 4S (five major iOS versions), the iPad Mini (four major iOS versions) and iPod Touch 5G (four major iOS versions).

On June 13, 2016, with the announcement of iOS 10, Apple dropped support for the iPad 2 because of its hardware and performance issues. The same goes with its successor and the iPad Mini (1st generation), making iOS 9.3.5 (Wi-Fi) or iOS 9.3.6 (Wi-Fi + Cellular) the final version that will run on the device.

"Broadpwn" exploit vulnerability
The iPad 2 is one of many computers, tablets, and mobile devices susceptible to the "Broadpwn" exploit, which was publicized in July 2017. Apple quickly released an update for iOS 10 to fix the problem, but a fix was never released for iOS 9 or earlier versions of iOS. As a result, older Apple devices incompatible with iOS 10, including the iPad 2, were left vulnerable indefinitely. This has raised concerns of potentially widespread attacks using the exploit, particularly in locations of concentrated iPad 2 deployment, such as certain primary and secondary schools.

2019 GPS rollover update

On July 22, 2019, Apple released iOS 9.3.6 for the CDMA model of the iPad 2 to fix issues caused by the GPS week number rollover. The issues would impact accuracy of GPS location and set the device's date and time to an incorrect value, preventing connection to HTTPS servers and, consequently, Apple's servers for activation, iCloud and the iTunes and App stores. The WiFi model and the GSM model are not affected by the rollover as the WiFi model lacks a GPS chipset and the GSM model uses a different chipset.

Hardware

The iPad 2 features an Apple A5 package-on-package (PoP) System-on-chip (SoC), which comprises a 1 GHz dual-core 32-bit Cortex-A9 CPU, 512 MB of RAM and a dual-core PowerVR SGX543MP2 GPU. Other features include front and rear cameras, a three-axis gyroscope, headset controls, proximity and ambient light sensors, microphone, magnetometer, accelerometer and a 9.7 inch multi-touch screen with a maximum resolution of 1024×768 hence resulting in 132 ppi. The iPad 2 has four physical switches, including a home button near the display that returns the user to the home screen, and three plastic physical switches on the sides: wake/sleep, volume up/down, and a third switch for either screen rotation lock or mute. The home button on the iPad 2 is "easier to double tap" than the previous generation of the iPad. Apple reduced the size of the iPad by eliminating the stamped sheet metal frame from the display, integrating new thinner glass technology for the touch screen overlay, and slightly reducing the space between the display and battery. The iPad 2's screen is thinner, lighter, and yet stronger than the original iPad's. The iPad 2 also supports screen mirroring via the digital AV adapter and through AirPlay as of iOS 5.

The iPad 2 has a 25 W·h rechargeable lithium-ion polymer battery that lasts 10 hours, like the original iPad. It is charged via USB or included 10 W, 2 A power adapter. The battery is 2.5 mm thick, 59% smaller than the original and has three cells instead of two. The improvements allowed the injection-molded plastic support frame to be omitted. The 10 W USB power adapter provides 4x the power of a conventional USB port. The tablet has an audio frequency response of 20 Hz to 20 kHz. Without third-party software it can play the following audio formats: HE-AAC, AAC, Protected AAC, MP3, MP3 VBR, Audible formats (2, 3, 4, AEA, AAX, and AAX+), ALAC, AIFF, and WAV.

The revised tablet adds front- and rear-facing cameras, which allow FaceTime video calls with other iPad 2s, the third generation iPad, iPhone 4 and 4S, fourth-generation iPod Touch and Macintosh computers (running Mac OS X 10.6.6 or later with a webcam). The 0.3 MP front camera shoots VGA-quality 30 frame/s video and VGA-quality still photos. The 0.7 MP back camera can shoot 720p HD video at 30 frame/s and has a 5× times digital zoom. Both shoot photo in a 4:3 fullscreen aspect ratio. The rear camera shoots video in 16:9 widescreen to match the 720p standard, although only the central 4:3 part of the recording is shown on the screen during recording. The forward-facing camera shoots in 4:3.

The Apple A5 chip doubles processing speed and has graphics processing that is up to nine times faster than the previous iPad. However, benchtests and hardware assessments performed by various third party news sources and technology blogs indicate that those claims are exaggerated; the benchmark assessment conducted by Anandtech showed that the GPU of the iPad 2 is only 3 times faster than that of the original iPad. CPU benchmarks conducted on the iPad 2 by iOSnoops indicate a 66% performance increase compared to the original iPad.

3G versions of the iPad 2 offer CDMA2000 support for customers using the device on a CDMA network or GSM/UMTS support for customers using the device on a GSM/UMTS network. The iPad Wi-Fi + 3G model includes an A-GPS receiver for tracking the user's location given permission. Also, the iPad 2 3G model includes a plastic cap-like band at the top on the back for the 3G antenna. The metallic grille for the microphone is replaced with a matching plastic black grille on the 3G model.
GSM models of iPad 2 use a SIM card while CDMA models use an ESN to connect to the cellular network.

The device is 15% lighter and 33% thinner than the original iPad; it is thinner than the iPhone 4 by 0.5 mm.
The size of the iPad 2 is also less than the original iPad at only 9.50 in ×7.31 in ×0.34 in (241.2 mm ×185.7 mm ×8.8 mm), compared to the original iPad's size at 9.56 in ×7.47 in ×0.5 in (242.8 mm ×189.7 mm ×13.4 mm).

After the announcement and release of the third generation iPad, the iPad 2, which continued to be available for purchase, received a hardware upgrade. The upgraded variant of the iPad 2 features a smaller version of the Apple A5 SoC, which is able to reduce battery consumption. Benchmark tests conducted by Anandtech concluded that the upgraded variant is able to last longer by at least an hour and a half, depending on the task that is conducted on the device. The maximum temperature that the device heated up to was also less than original iPad 2, tests conducted by the same organisation revealed that the upgraded variant was able to operate at 1 degree lower when performing intensive tasks. Performance difference between the two variants, according to Anandtech is negligible.

Accessories

The Smart Cover, first introduced with the iPad 2, is a screen protector that magnetically attaches to the face of the iPad. The cover has three folds which allow it to convert into a stand, which is also held together by magnets. While original iPad owners could purchase a black case that included a similarly folding cover, the Smart Cover is meant to be more minimal, easily detachable, and protects only the screen. Smart Covers have a microfiber bottom that cleans the front of the iPad, and wakes up the iPad when the cover is removed. There are five different colors of both polyurethane and leather, with leather being more expensive than the polyurethane version.

Apple offered several more accessories for the iPad 2, most of which were adapters for the proprietary 30-pin dock connector, the iPad's only port besides the headphone jack. A dock holds the iPad upright at an angle, and has a dock connector and audio line out port. The iPad can use Bluetooth keyboards that also work with Macs and PCs. The iPad can be charged by a standalone power adapter ("wall charger") also used for contemporary iPods and iPhones, and a 10 W charger was included with the iPad.

Reception
The iPad 2 received generally positive reviews, praising its Apple A5 processor and 720p camera. Joshua Topolsky of Engadget said that "for those of you who haven't yet made the leap, feel free to take a deep breath and dive in – the iPad 2 is as good as it gets right now. And it's really quite good." Jason Snell of Macworld said the following:

"Though the iPad 2 is an improvement on the original iPad in numerous ways, it's still an evolutionary product, not a revolutionary one. If you're happy with your current iPad, there's no reason to dump it just because there's a shinier, newer one. (This is not to say that millions of people won't do just that. I mean: shiny!) If you've invested in iPad accessories such as a dock or case, keep in mind that you probably won't be able to use them with the new iPad."

TechCrunch's MG Siegler stated: "Let me sum all of this up in a simple way: the iPad 2, should you buy one? Maybe — it depends on a few factors. Will you want to buy one? Yes. Use that information wisely."

Criticism
The closed and proprietary nature of iOS has garnered criticism, particularly by digital rights advocates such as the Electronic Frontier Foundation, computer engineer and activist Brewster Kahle, Internet-law specialist Jonathan Zittrain, and the Free Software Foundation who protested the iPad's introductory event and have targeted the iPad with their "Defective by Design" campaign. Competitor Microsoft, via a PR spokesman, has also criticized Apple's control over its platform.

Technical problems
At issue are restrictions imposed by the design of iOS, namely DRM intended to lock purchased media to Apple's platform, the development model (requiring a yearly subscription to distribute apps developed for the iOS), the centralized approval process for apps, as well as Apple's general control and lockdown of the platform itself. Particularly at issue is the ability for Apple to remotely disable or delete apps at will. Some in the tech community have expressed concern that the locked-down iOS represents a growing trend in Apple's approach to computing, particularly Apple's shift away from machines that hobbyists can "tinker with" and note the potential for such restrictions to stifle software innovation.

Some iPad 2 users reported performance issues when running iOS 8. Apple improved performance on the iPad 2 and the iPhone 4S on the iOS 8.1.1 update.

Commercial reception
During the first weekend of sale, more than one million units were sold. Soon after the first weekend, Ashok Kumar, a technology analyst for a financial firm predicted that Apple would sell 35 million iPad 2s in 2011. Investment banking firm, Piper Jaffray monitored the initial sales of the iPad 2 and reported that 70% of all iPad 2 sales were to first-time iPad buyers with 49% of buyers owning a PC compared to the initial buyers of the original iPad where only 26% of buyers owned a PC. 12,000 units were sold on auction site eBay in its first two weeks of release. When the iPhone 4S was released, rumors about the third generation iPad caused a decline in iPad 2 sales. Official figures released in the fourth quarter of 2011 indicate that Apple sold 11.4 million iPads in the third quarter, a 166% increase from the third quarter of 2010. The product helped create newer, larger markets for Apple in south east Asia.

In space
In 2011 two iPad 2 tablets were taken to the International Space Station after being approved. Other Apple products that were taken to ISS include the iPod and also two iPhone 4 phones. The other personal computing system aboard ISS were various versions of the ThinkPad laptop (IBM, later Lenovo brand).

Some of the applications the iPads were used for include Angry Birds game  and the ISS FIT (International Space Station Food Intake Tracker) for tracking astronauts' food consumption.

See also
 iPad accessories
 E-book reader
 Comparison of tablet computers

References

External links

 

Products introduced in 2011
Products and services discontinued in 2016
2
Tablet computers
Tablet computers introduced in 2011
iPad (2)
Touchscreen portable media players